This is a  list of lakes of Minnesota. The 1968 state survey found 15,291 lake basins, of which 3,257 were dry. If all basins over 2.5 acres were counted, Minnesota would have 21,871 lakes. The prevalence of lakes has generated many repeat names. For example, there are more than 200 Mud Lakes, 150 Long Lakes, and 120 Rice Lakes. All but four of Minnesota's 87 counties (Mower, Olmsted, Pipestone and Rock) contain at least one natural lake. Minnesota's lakes provide 44,926 miles of shoreline, more than the combined lake (~32,000 mi) and coastal (3,427 mi) shorelines of California.

Lakes whose coordinates are included below are visible in linked OSM map.  Minnesota's lakes are cataloged by the state Department of Natural Resources with a unique DNR Division of Waters Lake Number, which is listed for a subset of lakes in the table below.

See also

List of fishes of Minnesota
List of lakes in Minneapolis
List of lakes of the United States
List of rivers of Minnesota
List of longest streams of Minnesota

References

Sources

 Use the search facility at 

Lakes
Minnesota